The Bornean spiderhunter (Arachnothera everetti) is a species of bird in the family Nectariniidae.  The scientific name commemorates British colonial administrator and zoological collector Alfred Hart Everett.

Distribution and habitat
It is found in Borneo.  Its natural habitats are subtropical or tropical moist lowland forests and subtropical or tropical moist montane forests.

References

Arachnothera
Endemic birds of Borneo
Birds described in 1893
Taxonomy articles created by Polbot
Taxobox binomials not recognized by IUCN